Ido Cohen (born 16 August 2001) is an Israeli racing driver who is currently competing in the 2023 FIA Formula 3 Championship for Rodin Carlin.

Career summary

Lower formulae 
Cohen made his car racing debut in 2018, racing in Italian F4 and ADAC Formula 4. In Italian F4, he finished 30th overall (9th in the Rookie Championship), and in ADAC Formula 4, he finished 19th in the standings.

The Israeli would race in these same championships again for 2019, and fared much better, finishing 6th in Italian F4 and 13th in ADAC Formula 4.

Also in 2019, Cohen raced in the Formula 4 category of the FIA Motorsport Games for Team Israel, where he won the Qualifying Race, but then dropped back to 13th in the Main Race.

Euroformula Open Championship

2019 
Cohen raced in the final two rounds of the 2019 Euroformula Open Championship as a guest driver for Carlin Motorsport, where he had a best finish of 7th.

2020 
He would then race full time in the series in 2020 with Carlin, where he finished 7th in the standings with 114 points and 2 podiums.

FIA Formula 3 Championship

2021 

In October 2020, Cohen tested in the 2020 FIA Formula 3 Championship post season test with Carlin at the Circuit de Barcelona-Catalunya, where he managed 23rd on Day 1. He then tested again with the team in the second post season test at Circuito de Jerez, where he again achieved 23rd place. 
In February 2021, it was announced that Cohen would race full time for Carlin Buzz Racing in the FIA Formula 3 Championship, alongside Kaylen Frederick and former Italian F4 rival Jonny Edgar.

2022 

Cohen joined Jenzer Motorsport for the 2022 season, after testing with the Swiss outfit during the final day of 2021 post-season testing. Cohen had a disappointing season, but he scored his first points finish in the seventh round at Spielberg in the feature race, where he finished 8th. He ended the season 24th in the standings with 2 points, ahead of teammate Federico Malvestiti but far from his other teammate William Alatalo.

2023 
Staying in the category for a third season, Cohen would return to the rebranded Rodin Carlin outfit to drive in Formula 3, partnering Oliver Gray and Hunter Yeany.

Personal life 
Cohen's father Amihai Cohen owns Greek airline Bluebird Airways.

Karting record

Karting career summary 

† As Cohen was a guest driver, he was ineligible to score points.

Racing record

Racing career summary

† As Cohen was a guest driver, he was ineligible to score points.

Complete Italian F4 Championship results
(key) (Races in bold indicate pole position) (Races in italics indicate fastest lap)

Complete ADAC Formula 4 Championship results
(key) (Races in bold indicate pole position) (Races in italics indicate fastest lap)

Complete FIA Motorsport Games results

Complete Toyota Racing Series results 
(key) (Races in bold indicate pole position) (Races in italics indicate fastest lap)

Complete Euroformula Open Championship results 
(key) (Races in bold indicate pole position) (Races in italics indicate fastest lap)

Complete FIA Formula 3 Championship results 
(key) (Races in bold indicate pole position; races in italics indicate points for the fastest lap of top ten finishers)

† Driver did not finish the race, but was classified as they completed more than 90% of the race distance.

Complete Formula Regional European Championship results 
(key) (Races in bold indicate pole position) (Races in italics indicate fastest lap)

Complete Formula Regional Asian Championship results
(key) (Races in bold indicate pole position) (Races in italics indicate the fastest lap of top ten finishers)

References

External links
 

2001 births
Living people
Israeli racing drivers
Italian F4 Championship drivers
ADAC Formula 4 drivers
Euroformula Open Championship drivers
FIA Formula 3 Championship drivers
Mücke Motorsport drivers
Van Amersfoort Racing drivers
Carlin racing drivers
M2 Competition drivers
JD Motorsport drivers
Formula Regional Asian Championship drivers
Formula Regional European Championship drivers
Toyota Racing Series drivers
Jenzer Motorsport drivers
FIA Motorsport Games drivers
BlackArts Racing drivers